Jann Knijnenburg (21 March 1938 – 28 February 2010) was an Australian stage actress, model, and matriarch of a theatrical family.

Early life
Jann Freeman was born on March 21, 1938, the eldest child of bank manager James Maguire Freeman and Clarice Maud Freeman.

She performed with actors Barry Otto and John Stanton in the pioneering days of Brisbane theatre. She got her training as a librarian after graduating from All Hallows School in 1955 but was involved in a succession of beauty pageants in the 1950s, including the Miss Australia contest. Her second cousin was etiquette and modelling luminary June Dally-Watkins.

Career
In 1961, like many other young Australians at the time, she travelled to the United Kingdom to make her fortune. She spurned lodging at the Australian expat enclave of Earls Court, opting to live in the theatrical area of Gerards Cross. Her neighbours and friends included Margaret Rutherford, the British actress best known for her portrayal of Miss Marple. After turning her back on the catwalk and the stage she worked in a number of jobs with Hallmark Cards, Schweppes and IBM, where she handled public relations, before finding a position at Australia House. Part of the job involved planning functions and entertaining VIP guests, which on one occasion in 1963 included The Beatles.

Married life
During her time in London, Knijnenburg met a young Dutchman on a blind date, Albert (Appie) Knijnenburg, who was a trainee engineer. Jann fell in love with him, and they were engaged within a few weeks. While meeting Appie's parents in the Netherlands, the couple learned that if they were married for a year, they would be eligible for a migration bonus for Europeans leaving to Australia. They decided to marry immediately, in Appie's hometown Wassenaar. Upon returning to London, went back to their separate apartments, and to their old jobs, until they could arrange a large church wedding.

Australia
The Knijnenburgs then set sail for Brisbane aboard the liner Aurelia, arriving in 1965. The first of four sons, Johannes (Hans), soon arrived, followed in quick succession by David and Nicholas. She developed what became a lifelong fascination with antiques. A fourth boy, Michael, was born in 1974.

Jann had been raised as a Catholic and later in life became heavily involved with the church. She put her Christian ideals into practice by taking dozens of troubled individuals under her wing.

Later life and death 
In her last years, Jann contracted Pseudomyxoma peritonei, a rare and incurable abdominal cancer. After she was diagnosed, she and Appie decided to make the most of their remaining time together and went on a series of cruises, travelling to Tasmania, New Zealand and the Pacific Islands. They stopped only when it became clear that Jann would be unable to make any more journeys. Jann also maintained her interest in the arts, recording a voice-over for a short film just weeks before she died.

At the time of her death, Jann was well known and respected as an expert in various areas of antiques including jewelry, porcelain and dolls.

References

1938 births
2010 deaths
Australian stage actresses
Actresses from Brisbane
People educated at All Hallows' School